Bradinopyga cornuta is a species of dragonfly in the family Libellulidae known by the common names horned rock-dweller and flecked wall-skimmer. It is native to much of southeastern Africa, where it is widespread. It lives in open habitat around rock pools. It is threatened by water pollution, but it is not considered to be endangered.

References

Libellulidae
Insects described in 1911
Taxa named by Friedrich Ris
Taxonomy articles created by Polbot